Thomas Bow City Asphalt is a privately owned civil engineering and groundworks company located in Nottingham, United Kingdom.

History 
Thomas Bow was first set up by Lawrence Bow in 1867 and from small beginnings has developed into one of the East Midlands major building, civil engineering and groundwork contractors. The business has remained a family firm and is currently headed up by sixth generation chairman and managing director Alistair Bow. Alistair is joined by fellow directors Alex Gardner, David Wilkinson and John Allen.

In 2005 Thomas Bow joined forces with City Asphalt Ltd working as sister companies until August 2010 when the two companies merged and rebranded as Thomas Bow City Asphalt. The company is now a major player in the Highways Maintenance area.

Thomas Bow City Asphalt is consistently listed on the London Stock Exchange report identifying ‘1000 Companies to Inspire Britain’ and the Nottingham Post ‘Top 200 Businesses’ list.

In 2017 Thomas Bow celebrated its 150th anniversary in business. The firm threw a big event attended by employees, former employees and local dignitaries.

Major projects 
Thomas Bow was contracted to build Wilford Power Station, the Raleigh Bicycle Company factory and Barclays Bank in Market Square, Nottingham.

Thomas Bow rebuilt some buildings in Nottingham during World War II including projects such as reconstructing the bombed William Dixon & Co. factory and camouflaging the roof of the Royal Ordnance Factory. The most significant project Thomas Bow was contracted to rebuild was Newark’s Ransome & Marles bearings factory which was devastated by an air raid on 7 March 1941, a day which became known as Newark’s Black Friday.

More recently the company has been contracted to deliver work for Donington Park race track, Birmingham Airport and the Lincoln Transport Hub.

CSR 
Thomas Bow City Asphalt is heavily involved in the local community with MD Alistair chairman of many not-for-profit businesses, charities and sports clubs including Nottingham R.F.C. and Walesby Forest Scout Camp.

References 

Companies based in Nottingham
Construction and civil engineering companies of England
British companies established in 1867
1867 establishments in England
Construction and civil engineering companies established in 1867